The 1960–61 Scottish League Cup was the fifteenth season of Scotland's second football knockout competition. The competition was won Rangers, who defeated Kilmarnock in the Final.

First round

Group 1

Play-off

Group 2

Group 3

Group 4

Group 5

Group 6

Group 7

Group 8

Group 9

Supplementary Round

First Leg

Second Leg

Quarter-finals

First Leg

Second Leg

Semi-finals

Final

References

General

Specific

Lea
Scottish League Cup seasons